Delroy George Lindo (born 18 November 1952) is an English-American actor. He is the recipient of such accolades as a NAACP Image Award, a Satellite Award, and nominations for a Drama Desk Award, a Helen Hayes Award, a Tony Award, two Critics' Choice Television Awards, and three Screen Actors Guild Awards.

Lindo has played prominent roles in four Spike Lee films: West Indian Archie in Malcolm X (1992), Woody Carmichael in Crooklyn (1994), Rodney Little in Clockers (1995), and Paul in Da 5 Bloods (2020); he received universal acclaim for his performance in Da 5 Bloods as a Vietnam War veteran, winning the New York Film Critics Circle Award for Best Actor and the National Society of Film Critics Award for Best Actor. Lindo also played Bo Catlett in Get Shorty (1995), Arthur Rose in The Cider House Rules (1999), and Detective Castlebeck in Gone in 60 Seconds (2000). Lindo starred as Alderman Ronin Gibbons in the TV series The Chicago Code (2011), as Winter on the series Believe (2014), and as Adrian Boseman in The Good Fight (2017–2021).

Early life 
Delroy Lindo was born in 1952 in Lewisham, south-east London, the son of Jamaican parents. His mother had immigrated to the UK in 1951 from Jamaica to work as a nurse, and his father worked in various jobs. Lindo grew up in nearby Eltham and attended Woolwich Polytechnic School for Boys. He became interested in acting as a child when he appeared in a nativity play at school. As a teenager, Lindo and his mother moved to Toronto, Ontario. When he was 16, they moved to San Francisco. At the age of 24, Lindo began his studies in acting at the American Conservatory Theater, graduating in 1979.

Career 
Lindo's film debut came in 1976 with the Canadian John Candy comedy Find the Lady, followed by two other roles in films, including an army sergeant in More American Graffiti (1979).

For a decade from the early 1980s Lindo's career was more focused on theatre acting than film, although he has said this was not a conscious decision. In 1982 he debuted on Broadway in "Master Harold"...and the Boys, directed by the play's South African author Athol Fugard. By 1988, Lindo had earned a Tony nomination for his portrayal of Herald Loomis in August Wilson's Joe Turner's Come and Gone.

Lindo returned to film in the science fiction film Salute of the Jugger (1990), which has become a cult classic. Although he had turned down Spike Lee for a role in Do the Right Thing, Lee cast him as Woody Carmichael in the drama Crooklyn (1994), which brought Lindo notice. His other roles with Lee include West Indian Archie, a psychotic gangster, in Malcolm X and a starring role as a neighborhood drug dealer in Clockers.

Other films in which he has starring roles are Barry Sonnenfeld's Get Shorty (1995), Ron Howard's Ransom (1996) and Soul of the Game (1996), as the baseball player Satchel Paige.

In 1998 Lindo co-starred as African-American explorer Matthew Henson, in the TV film Glory & Honor, directed by Kevin Hooks. It portrayed Henson's nearly 20-year partnership with Commander Robert Peary in Arctic exploration and their effort to find the Geographic North Pole in 1909. Lindo received a Satellite Award for best actor for his portrayal of Henson. Lindo has continued to work in television, and in 2006 was seen on the short-lived NBC drama Kidnapped.

Lindo had a small role in the 1995 film Congo, playing the corrupt Captain Wanta. Lindo was not credited for the role. He played an angel in the comedy film A Life Less Ordinary (1997).

He guest-starred on The Simpsons in the episode "Brawl in the Family", playing a character named Gabriel.

In the British film Wondrous Oblivion (2003), directed by Paul Morrison, Lindo starred as Dennis Samuels, the father of a Jamaican immigrant family in London in the 1950s. Lindo said he made the film in honor of his parents, who had similarly moved to London in those years.

In 2007, Lindo began an association with Berkeley Repertory Theatre in Berkeley, California, when he directed Tanya Barfield's play The Blue Door. In the autumn of 2008, Lindo revisited August Wilson's play Joe Turner's Come and Gone, directing a production at the Berkeley Rep. In 2010, he played the role of elderly seer Bynum in David Lan's production of Joe Turner at the Young Vic Theatre in London.

Lindo was in the main cast of the Fox crime drama The Chicago Code (2011), the NBC fantasy series Believe, and the ABC soap Blood & Oil (2015). In 2017, Lindo began playing Adrian Boseman in the CBS legal drama The Good Fight, a role he would star in for the series' first four seasons and reprise as a guest star in its fifth season. Lindo was cast as the lead in an ABC drama pilot Harlem's Kitchen in March 2020.

In 2015, Lindo was expected to play Marcus Garvey in a biopic of the black nationalist historical figure that had been in pre-production for several years. Lindo appeared in the action film Point Break (2015), the horror film Malicious (2018), the drama Battlecreek, Da 5 Bloods (2020), another collaboration with Spike Lee, and The Harder They Fall (2021) as Bass Reeves. For his role in Da 5 Bloods, Lindo received critical acclaim and a number of accolades.

Entertainment Weekly said of Hulu's comedy series Unprisoned (2023), "Delroy Lindo is so good it should be illegal."

Upcoming
It was announced in July 2021 that Lindo would star as Mr Nancy in the British Amazon Prime miniseries adaptation of Neil Gaiman's Anansi Boys alongside Malachi Kirby. In November, Lindo officially joined the cast of the upcoming Marvel Studios film Blade in an undisclosed role.

Personal life
Lindo married his wife Nashormeh Lindo in 1990. They settled down in Oakland, California, in 1996, having moved from New York City and preferring the San Francisco Bay Area to Los Angeles. Their son Damiri was born in 2001.

In 2014, Lindo graduated with a master's degree in fine arts from New York University's Gallatin School. In addition, he was awarded an honorary doctorate in Arts and Humanities from Virginia Union University.

Filmography

Film

Television

Theatre

Video games

Awards and nominations

References

External links 

 Mosi Secret, "The Long, Occasionally Dark, and Ultimately Triumphant Career of Delroy Lindo", GQ, 20 April 2021

1952 births
Living people
20th-century English male actors
21st-century English male actors
American Conservatory Theater alumni
Black British male actors
English expatriates in the United States
English male film actors
English male stage actors
English male television actors
English people of Jamaican descent
Male actors from London
Male actors from San Francisco
People from Eltham
People from Lewisham
San Francisco State University alumni
American people of Jamaican descent